Candover Investments plc. was a British-based, private equity firm, specialising in arranging and leading large buyouts and buyins. Candover Investments is structured as an investment trust. On 31 August 2010, Candover announced that it would unwind its assets and return money to shareholders and investors.

At its peak, Candover had offices in London, Paris, Madrid and Milan. Since 1980, Candover raised nine funds with total capital commitments of more than €8.7 billion.

On 19 April 2018, the Company was placed into members’ voluntary liquidation.

References
http://www.candoverinvestments.com/?file=assets/downloads/2018/Logo-RNS-20-april.pdf

External links
 Official Website

Investment trusts of the United Kingdom
Financial services companies established in 1980
Private equity firms of the United Kingdom